Pae Tal-jun (born 1936) is a high-ranking North Korean politician and bureaucrat.  He currently serves as Minister of State Construction Control and as Chairman of the Central Committee of the Korean Union of Architects. He was appointed to the Ministerial post in 1998 by the 10th Supreme People's Assembly, at which he was also a delegate.  

Pae also served as a delegate to the Assembly's 11th session in 2003. In 2004, he was awarded the Order of Kim Il-sung.

Pae is a graduate of Bratislava University of Czechoslovakia.  He began his career as a city planner in Pyongyang in 1966, becoming a vice chairman of the State Construction Committee in 1983.

See also

Politics of North Korea
List of Koreans

References
Yonhap News Agency.  "Who's who in North Korea," pp. 787–812 in 

1936 births
Living people
Members of the Supreme People's Assembly
Architecture in North Korea
Place of birth missing (living people)
Government ministers of North Korea
Recipients of the Order of Kim Il-sung